The following outline is provided as an overview of and topical guide to South Dakota:

South Dakota – state located in the Midwestern region of the United States. It is named after the Lakota and Dakota Sioux American Indian tribes.  South Dakota is the 17th most extensive, but the 5th least populous and the 5th least densely populated of the 50 United States.  Once the southern portion of the Dakota Territory, South Dakota became a state on November 2, 1889 simultaneously with North Dakota.  Pierre is the state capital and Sioux Falls, with a population of 159,000, is South Dakota's largest city.

General reference 

 Names
 Common name: South Dakota
 Pronunciation: 
 Official name: State of South Dakota
 Abbreviations and name codes
 Postal symbol:  SD
 ISO 3166-2 code:  US-SD
 Internet second-level domain:  .sd.us
 Nicknames
 Artesian State
 Blizzard State
 Coyote State
 Land of Infinite Variety
 Mount Rushmore State (officially adopted in 1980 in place of the former nickname of Sunshine State)
 Sunshine State
 Adjectivals: South Dakota, South Dakotan
 Demonym: South Dakotan

Geography of South Dakota 

Geography of South Dakota
 South Dakota is: a U.S. state, a federal state of the United States of America
 Location
 Northern hemisphere
 Western hemisphere
 Americas
 North America
 Anglo America
 Northern America
 United States of America
 Contiguous United States
 Central United States
 West North Central States
 The Dakotas
 Midwestern United States
 Great plains
 Population of South Dakota: 814,180  (2010 U.S. Census)
 Area of South Dakota:
 Atlas of South Dakota

Places in South Dakota 

Places in South Dakota
 Historic places in South Dakota
 Abandoned communities in South Dakota
 Ghost towns in South Dakota
 National Historic Landmarks in South Dakota
 National Register of Historic Places listings in South Dakota
 Bridges on the National Register of Historic Places in South Dakota
 National Natural Landmarks in South Dakota
 National parks in South Dakota
 State parks in South Dakota

Environment of South Dakota 

 Climate of South Dakota
 Superfund sites in South Dakota
 Wildlife of South Dakota
 Fauna of South Dakota
 Birds of South Dakota
 Reptiles
 Snakes of South Dakota

Natural geographic features of South Dakota 

 Lakes of South Dakota
 Mountains of South Dakota
 Rivers of South Dakota

Regions of South Dakota

Administrative divisions of South Dakota 

 The 66 Counties of the State of South Dakota
 Municipalities in South Dakota
 Cities in South Dakota
 State capital of South Dakota: Pierre
 Largest city in South Dakota: Sioux Falls
 City nicknames in South Dakota
 Towns in South Dakota
 List of townships in South Dakota

Demography of South Dakota 

Demographics of South Dakota
 South Dakota locations by per capita income

Government and politics of South Dakota 

Politics of South Dakota
 Form of government: U.S. state government
 United States congressional delegations from South Dakota
 South Dakota State Capitol
 Elections in South Dakota
 United States House of Representatives election in South Dakota, 2002
 United States House of Representatives election in South Dakota, 2004
 United States House of Representatives election in South Dakota, 2006
 United States House of Representatives election in South Dakota, 2008
 United States House of Representatives election in South Dakota, 2010
 United States House of Representatives election in South Dakota, 2012
 United States Senate election in South Dakota, 1980
 United States Senate election in South Dakota, 1986
 United States Senate election in South Dakota, 1992
 United States Senate election in South Dakota, 1996
 United States Senate election in South Dakota, 1998
 United States Senate election in South Dakota, 2002
 United States Senate election in South Dakota, 2004
 United States Senate election in South Dakota, 2008
 United States Senate election in South Dakota, 2010
 United States presidential election in South Dakota, 1972
 United States presidential election in South Dakota, 2000
 United States presidential election in South Dakota, 2004
 United States presidential election in South Dakota, 2008
 Political party strength in South Dakota

Branches of the government of South Dakota 

Government of South Dakota

Executive branch of the government of South Dakota 
 Governor of South Dakota
 Lieutenant Governor of South Dakota
 Secretary of State of South Dakota
 State departments
 South Dakota Department of Corrections
 South Dakota Department of Education
 South Dakota Department of Transportation

Legislative branch of the government of South Dakota 

 South Dakota State Legislature (bicameral)
 Upper house: South Dakota Senate
 Lower house: South Dakota House of Representatives

Judicial branch of the government of South Dakota 

 Federal courthouses in South Dakota
Courts of South Dakota
 Supreme Court of South Dakota
 South Dakota Circuit Courts

Law and order in South Dakota 

Law of South Dakota
 Cannabis in South Dakota
 Capital punishment in South Dakota
 Individuals executed in South Dakota
 Constitution of South Dakota
 Crime in South Dakota
 Gun laws in South Dakota
 Law enforcement in South Dakota
 Law enforcement agencies in South Dakota
 South Dakota Highway Patrol

Military in South Dakota 

 South Dakota Air National Guard
 South Dakota Army National Guard

History of South Dakota 

History of South Dakota

History of South Dakota, by period 

Timeline of South Dakota
Prehistory of South Dakota
Indigenous peoples
English territory of Rupert's Land, 1670–1707
French colony of Louisiane, 1699–1764
Treaty of Fontainebleau of 1762
British territory of Rupert's Land, (1707–1818)-1870
Spanish (though predominantly Francophone) district of Alta Luisiana, 1764–1803
Third Treaty of San Ildefonso of 1800
French district of Haute-Louisiane, 1803
Louisiana Purchase of 1803
Unorganized U.S. territory created by the Louisiana Purchase, 1803–1804
Lewis and Clark Expedition, 1804–1806
District of Louisiana, 1804–1805
Territory of Louisiana, 1805–1812
Territory of Missouri, 1812–1821
Anglo-American Convention of 1818
Unorganized Territory, 1821–1854
Mexican–American War, April 25, 1846 – February 2, 1848
Treaty of Fort Laramie of 1851
Territory of Michigan east of Missouri River, 1805–(1834–1836)–1837
Territory of Wisconsin east of Missouri River, (1836–1838)–1848
Territory of Iowa east of Missouri River, 1838–1846
Territory of Minnesota east of Missouri River, 1849–1858
Territory of Nebraska west of Missouri River, (1854–1861)–1867
Territory of Dakota, 1861–1889
American Civil War, April 12, 1861 – May 13, 1865
Dakota in the American Civil War
Red Cloud's War, 1866–1868
Treaty of Fort Laramie of 1868
Black Hills War, 1876–1877
State of South Dakota becomes 40th State admitted to the United States of America on November 2, 1889
Pine Ridge Campaign, 1890–1891
Wounded Knee Massacre, 1890
Spanish–American War, April 25 – August 12, 1898
Wind Cave National Park established on January 9, 1903
Wounded Knee Incident, February 27 – May 8, 1973
Badlands National Park established on November 10, 1978

History of South Dakota, by region

Municipalities 
 History of Beresford, South Dakota
 History of Brookings, South Dakota
 History of Rapid City, South Dakota
 History of Sioux Falls, South Dakota
 History of Yankton, South Dakota

History of South Dakota, by subject 
 South Dakota territorial evolution

Culture of South Dakota 

Culture of South Dakota
 Gambling in South Dakota
 Casinos in South Dakota
 South Dakota Lottery
 Libraries in South Dakota
 List of Carnegie libraries in South Dakota
 Museums in South Dakota
 Religion in South Dakota
 Episcopal Diocese of South Dakota
 Scouting in South Dakota
 State symbols of South Dakota
 Flag of the State of South Dakota 
 Great Seal of the State of South Dakota

The Arts in South Dakota 
 Music of South Dakota

Sports in South Dakota 

Sports in South Dakota

Economy and infrastructure of South Dakota 

Economy of South Dakota
 Communications in South Dakota
 Newspapers in South Dakota
 Radio stations in South Dakota
 Television stations in South Dakota
 Energy in South Dakota
 Power stations in South Dakota
 Solar power in South Dakota
 Wind power in South Dakota
 Health care in South Dakota
 Hospitals in South Dakota
 Transportation in South Dakota
 Airports in South Dakota
 Rail transport in South Dakota
 Railroads in South Dakota
 Roads in South Dakota
 Numbered highways in South Dakota
 Vehicle registration plates of South Dakota

Education in South Dakota 

Education in South Dakota
 Schools in South Dakota
 School districts in South Dakota
 High schools in South Dakota
 Colleges and universities in South Dakota
 College athletic programs in South Dakota
 Specific colleges and universities
 University of South Dakota
 South Dakota State University

See also

Topic overview:
South Dakota

Index of South Dakota-related articles

References

External links 

South Dakota
South Dakota
 1